Antony Garrett Lisi (born January 24, 1968), known as Garrett Lisi, is an American theoretical physicist. Lisi works as an independent researcher without an academic position. 

Lisi is known for "An Exceptionally Simple Theory of Everything," a paper proposing a unified field theory based on the E Lie group, combining particle physics with Einstein's theory of gravitation. The theory is incomplete and has unresolved problems. The theory has been extensively criticized in the scientific community.

Biography

Education and career
Lisi was born in Los Angeles and raised in San Diego, California. He graduated from Cate School in 1987.  Lisi went on to receive two B.S. degrees with highest honors in physics and mathematics from the University of California, Los Angeles, in 1991. Lisi received a Ph.D. in physics from the University of California, San Diego, in 1999.  Lisi then left academia.

In July 2006, Lisi was awarded an FQXi grant to conduct research in quantum mechanics and unification. In June 2007, Lisi thought that the algebraic structure he had constructed in an attempt to unify the standard model of particle physics with general relativity partially matched part of the algebraic structure of the E Lie group. In July 2007, Lisi traveled to the inaugural FQXi conference in Reykjavík, Iceland, to give several academic talks.

Lisi's paper, "An exceptionally simple theory of everything", was posted to the arXiv on 6 November 2007. His theory was discussed on major physics blogs and reported by media sources in several countries. Lisi presented his theory at the TED Conference on 28 February 2008, and has since presented several academic talks and colloquia. The theory has been extensively criticized in the scientific community. Back in 2008, "Scientific America" stated, "Today the theory is being largely but not entirely ignored". 

In July 2009, at a FQXi conference in the Azores, Lisi made a public bet with Frank Wilczek that superparticles would not be detected by 8 July 2015. After a one-year extension to allow for more data collection from the Large Hadron Collider, Frank Wilczek conceded the superparticle bet to Lisi in 2016.

Physics research

Quantum mechanics
On 8 May 2006, in an arXiv preprint, "Quantum mechanics from a universal action reservoir," Lisi proposed that the path integral formulation of quantum mechanics can be derived from information theory and the existence of a universal action reservoir.

An Exceptionally Simple Theory of Everything
Lisi's main work in theoretical physics is his Exceptionally Simple Theory of Everything. It proposes a unified field theory combining a grand unification theory of particle physics with Albert Einstein's general relativistic description of gravitation, using the largest simple exceptional Lie algebra, E. Lisi stated that gravity, the standard model bosons and fermions can be unified as parts of an E superconnection. The theory, called E Theory, also predicts the existence of many new particles. He then designed a web application, the Elementary Particle Explorer, for visualizing the charge structure of the elementary particles in the standard model, in grand unified theories, and in E Theory.

Lisi's theory has been extensively criticized in the scientific community. Lisi acknowledges that his theory is incomplete. In a Scientific American post, Lisi stated, "(the 3 generation) … issue remains the most significant problem, and until it is solved the theory is not complete and cannot be considered much more than a speculative proposal. Without fully describing how the three generations of fermions work, the theory and all predictions from it remain tenuous."

In June 2010 Lisi posted "An explicit embedding of gravity and the Standard Model in E", and in 2015 an update and generalization, "Lie group cosmology", in which he claims to have solved the 3 generations problem.

Invention USA
In 2011 and 2012, Lisi co-hosted Invention USA (with Reichart von Wolfsheild), a two-season, reality TV series on the History channel. Lisi was replaced as co-host by Scotty Ziegler in the second season.

References

External links

 
 
  – an application designed by Lisi
  – Lisi's personal research wiki
  
 
 

1968 births
21st-century American physicists
American surfers
Independent scientists
Living people
Particle physicists
People from Los Angeles
Theoretical physicists
University of California, Los Angeles alumni
University of California, San Diego alumni